Seiyun (also transliterated as Saywun, Sayoun or Say'un;   Hadhrami pronunciation: ,; Old South Arabian: 𐩪𐩺𐩱𐩬 S¹yʾn) is a city in the region and Governorate of Hadhramaut in Yemen.

It is said that the origin of the city was a resting point for travellers. There was a cafe with a woman named Seiyun there, and the area was named after her in her honor. Since then, the city has become the largest area of Hadhramaut valley. The most prominent villages surrounding the city include Madurah, Mérida, Burr, Hazkir, and Houta Sultana.

It is served by Seiyun Airport. It is also well known for the Seiyun Palace of the Sultan of Kathiri built in 1920s with mud and stones. It oversees the market place for merchants coming from outside.

History
Seiyun is first mentioned in the beginning of the 4th-century, which dates back to the reign of King Dhamar who ruled at the beginning of the 4th-century the area around Hadhramaut Valley and known for destroying sixty thousand columns in the area. Destruction of the columns confirms that the Hadhramaut region was undergoing an economic prosperity owing from spread of grape cultivation in large areas under the climatic conditions different from the current circumstances.

Seiyun during the Islamic period emerged as a village in the era of the Rashidun Caliphate. It was administratively followed by the city of Tarim. This was the case during the Umayyad period as well. In 708, it became administratively affiliated with the city of Shibam. The son of Haritha led the revolution in 1179 but it gained its autonomy only in the year 1501 when it became the capital of the valley in the era of Badr Abu Tuwairq (1501-1556), where an administrative unit consisting of a sultanate that extended from Ain Ba to the west of the city of Dhofar was founded. In the 18th-century, Yafa conquered the cities of Hadhramaut and took over many parts of Seiyun, where the state was established. In 1852, it became the capital of the State of Kathiri (Aden-Kathiri) which was within the British Aden Protectorate (1869 - 1963). Its fortified fortress, the Sultan's Palace, was the seat of Sultan al-Kathiri. Postage stamps from the Sultanate were sometimes inscribed "Kathiri State of Seiyun." After the independence from British colonialism, Seiyun became the capital of the Southern district in the fifth province of Hadhramaut.

Geography
Sayun District, in which Seiyun is serving as its capital, is about 804 square kilometers wide. The district is located in the central part of Hadhramaut and Wadi Hadhramaut. It is bordered to the south by Tarim and Sah Districts, and to the west by Shibam District. Siyoun District is about 320 kilometers from the provincial capital Mukalla. As for the terrain, the district consists of a relatively flat surface that forms a part of Wadi Hadhramaut surrounded by mountain ranges from the northern and southern sides leading to the northern and southern plateaus. These mountain ranges also penetrate several sub-valleys of Hadhramaut Valley, Wadi Bin Salman in Batarab and the northern part of Wadi Madr Bbour.

Climate
The climate is tropical with a high temperature in the summer (26 - 42 °C) and a mild temperature in the winter (6 - 28 °C). Rain is rare and usually falls from mid-spring until autumn.

See also
Kathiri State of Seiyun in Hadhramaut

References

External links

Populated places in Hadhramaut Governorate